Careers is the debut studio album by American duo Beverly. It was released July 1, 2014 on LP / CD by Kanine Records and cassette by That Summer Feeling.

Track listing

References

2014 debut albums
Kanine Records albums